Alon Davidi (born 18 October 1973) is an Israeli politician. He has been mayor of Sderot since 2013.

Political career 
Ahead of the 2021 Israeli legislative election, he announced on 31 January 2021 that he would leave Likud and join Yamina. He was placed in the seventh slot of the Yamina list ahead of the election. After Davidi resigned from the list, the seat was given to Idit Silman, who was placed eighth on the party's list.

References 

Living people
1973 births
Likud politicians
Yamina politicians
21st-century Israeli politicians
Mayors of places in Israel
People from Sderot